Keep Punching is a 1939 film about boxing. Its primary character is Henry Armstrong (born Henry Jackson). Unlike most films of the era, its cast was composed entirely of African Americans.

The film includes Whitey's Lindy Hoppers (Lindy Hop) performing the much imitated Big Apple Routine. A film clip of the dance scene was also released as the short “Jittering Jitterbugs” in 1943 showing the Big Apple routine choreographed by Frankie Manning and the a Jitterbug dance competition that followed in the film.

Plot 
Golden gloves champion Henry Jackson turns professional and gets scheduled into a tough match. Days before the match, he finds an old school friend of his, Frank Harrison, unaware that Frank is betting heavily on his loss. Frank sets Henry up with beautiful Jerry Jordan, who is instructed to get him drunk and impede him in any way possible, due to Frank blackmailing her. On the day of the fight she slips him a sleeping drug.

Cast 
It was directed by John Clein. Performers in the film include Dooley Wilson and George Wiltshire. The film also features boxing champion Henry Armstrong.
	
Henry Armstrong
Willie Bryant
Mae Johnson
Hamtree Harrington
Francine Everett
Canada Lee
Lionel Monagas
Arthur "Dooky" Wilson
Hilda Offley
Walter Robinson

References

1939 films
American boxing films
1930s American films